The 2019 CFL–LFA Draft took place on January 14, 2019. 27 players were chosen from an invited pool of 51 Mexican players: 34 from the Liga de Fútbol Americano Profesional (LFA) (a professional American football league) and 17 seniors from Mexican university teams.

Background
In October 2018, Canadian Football League commissioner Randy Ambrosie outlined a plan to grow the CFL's presence, which he dubbed CFL 2.0, including growth internationally. In November 2018, the LFA signed a non-binding Letter of Intent with the CFL to share resources and to allow for at least one CFL game to be played in Mexico, as wells as lay the ground work for special Mexican-specific editions of the CFL Combine and CFL Draft.

On January 11, 2019, 51 players from the LFA and Mexican college ranks were announced as participants in a combine to beheld on January 13 and a 27-player draft to be held on January 14, 2019. Each CFL team sent scouts and were reported to likely receive four picks. Consensus after the combine was that 6-18 players were of (or could be made into) CFL camp caliber, but that a majority of players had no professional potential.  This led to criticism of commissioner Ambrosie for spending time and resources on this additional draft, when a collective bargaining agreement with the CFLPA still had not been reached. Originally, there were plans for a 4-round 36-player draft but, after the combine and interviews, was scaled back to a 3-round, 27-player draft. BC Lions General Manager Ed Hervey was reported to have, "settled for athletic and the ability to speak English" in player evaluations. It was not reported if drafted players would count towards a team's National or International slots.

On January 12, 2019, the LFA held their own domestic 66-player draft in advance of the CFL's draft.

Selection order
Unlike the normal CFL Draft, which sets selection order based on a team's record the previous season (similar to the NFL Draft), the CFL–LFA draft instead used a weighted lottery system where teams receive more balls in a selection bin depending on their record, with more balls increasing the chance at a higher draft priority (similar to the NBA Draft). The draft order was set the night before the draft: The Edmonton Eskimos received the first pick, despite Edmonton's general manager and head coach both skipping the combine and draft process, sending a subordinate instead. Edmonton GM Brock Sunderland in particular was largely dismissive of the entire process.

Selections

Round one

Round two

Round three

See also
2019 CFL Draft
2019 European CFL Draft

References

Canadian College Draft
2019 in Canadian football
Liga de Fútbol Americano Profesional